Richard King is an American film sound designer and editor who has worked on over 70 films.  A native of Tampa, Florida, he graduated from the University of South Florida with a BFA in painting and film.   He has won Academy Awards for Best Sound Editing for the films Master and Commander: The Far Side of the World (2003), The Dark Knight (2008), Inception (2010), and Dunkirk (2017). He was also nominated for War of the Worlds (2005), and Interstellar (2014). He has won Bafta awards for Master and Commander: The Far Side of the World (2003), Inception (2010), and Dunkirk (2017) and four MPSE awards for Best Sound Effects Editing & Design, as well as the MPSE Career Achievement Award (2016).

References

External links
 Short documentary on the sound of Master & Commander
 
 "The Sounds of Realism in Master and Commander", NPR, November 13, 2003
 
 
 
 
 
 
 
 
 
 
 
 
 
 
 
 
 
 Film Sound Master Class 

American sound editors
Best Sound BAFTA Award winners
Best Sound Editing Academy Award winners
Living people
People from Tampa, Florida
American sound designers
University of South Florida alumni
Year of birth missing (living people)